Megatylopus (also known as the North American camel) is an extinct genus of large camel, endemic to North America from the Late Miocene to the Pliocene, existing for approximately . Fossil distribution ranged from North Carolina to California.

References

Miocene even-toed ungulates
Pliocene even-toed ungulates
Prehistoric even-toed ungulate genera
Miocene genus first appearances
Pliocene genus extinctions
Neogene mammals of North America
Blancan
Hemphillian
Fossil taxa described in 1909
Ringold Formation Miocene Fauna
Camelids